Popular Favorites is the second studio album by the Oblivians. It was released in 1996 on Crypt Records.

Production
The album was recorded in Memphis and New York City. "Christina" is a cover of the Brownie McGhee song.

Critical reception

The Toronto Sun called the album "supremely filthy," writing that "it makes Jon Spencer sound like Pat Boone." Miami New Times deemed it "a 34-minute slugfest that highlights the band's blues chops ... and showcases their ability to pulverize a riff into fine powder." The Commercial Appeal noted that "for manic deranged 'blooze' with a healthy dose of unleashed libido, the Oblivians are truth in packaging."

Track listing
 "Christina" (McGhee) – 1:59 
 "Trouble" (Yarber/Oblivians) – 1:57 
 "The Leather" (Hurt/Modock/Pendleton) – 3:10 
 "Guitar Shop Asshole" (Friedl/Oblivians) – 1:25 
 "Hey Mama, Look at Sis" (Perry/Teel) – 1:46 
 "Part of Your Plan" (Cartwright/Oblivians) – 2:15 
 "Do the Milkshake" (Yarber/Oblivians) – 5:19 
 "Strong Come On" (Yarber/Oblivians) – 1:28 
 "She's a Hole" (Friedl/Oblivians) – 1:42 
 "Bad Man" (Cartwright/Oblivians) – 2:42 
 "He's Your Man" (Cartwright/Oblivians) – 2:14 
 "Drill" (Friedl/Fritsch/Oblivians) – 1:20 
 "You Better Behave" (Cartwright/Oblivians) – 1:45 
 "Pinstripe Willie" (Cartwright/Oblivians) – 1:26 
 "You Fucked Me Up, You Put Me Down" (Cartwright/Oblivians) – 1:56 
 "Emergency" (Friedl/Oblivians) – 1:59

Personnel
Greg Oblivian – Guitar, drums, vocals
Eric Oblivian – Guitar, drums, vocals
Jack Oblivian – Guitar, drums, vocals

References

1996 albums
Oblivians albums
Crypt Records albums